Kilchattan Bay is a village on the Isle of Bute, Scotland. It lies on the island's southern end, along the coast road at the foot of a steep hill called the Suidhe Chattan which shields the village from the prevailing westerly wind. The village faces the mainland to the east across the Firth of Clyde. A sandy bay known locally as the Wee Bay sweeps around to the north.

To the south along the coast is the start of the West Island Way which leads along the rocky shore and past the lighthouse which marks the southern end of the island.

History

The village is named after the sixth century bishop, Saint Cathan, who established a hermitage at this location in AD 539.  His nephew was Saint Blane and a chapel was established in his honour in the 12th century.  St. Blane's Chapel still exists as a ruin, one mile to the south of Kilchattan village.

The village developed as a row of fisherman's houses.  Further developments included a quarry, stone pier and a lime kiln which can still be seen behind St. Blane's Villa. The limestone used in the kiln being mined on the hillside behind the village. Part of the old mine workings is now used as the reservoir for the village. Overlooking the reservoir is the ruined remain of Kelspoke Castle.
  
A new wooden pier was constructed in 1880 when the village became a regular port-of-call for steamers which carried trippers from the great city of Glasgow and local traffic such as the output of tile factory (closed 1915) at Kingarth. The St. Blane's Hotel was constructed between the two piers and still services the tourist trade today (now closed). Since that heyday, the steamer traffic has disappeared with the new pier closing in 1955 to scheduled steamers. The pier was used on an occasional basis before the wooden structure deteriorated and was demolished in 1976.
Queen Elizabeth II and her consort landed on the pier from the Royal Yacht Britannia in 1957 on a visit to the island before driving through the village. The old stone pier, being more durable, has been renovated and now serves as the main landing point.

The village at one stage had a post office, drapers, bakery, grocers, greengrocers, cafe (owned by the family of Lena Zavaroni) and a tearoom situated at the pier. It was also one of the last places in Scotland (until the early 1970s) where milk was delivered from a churn with residents collecting their milk in jugs from a churn in the back of a van.

A recent landslide has removed a section of the path from the village to the top of Suidhe Chattan.

Famous residents
Graeme Lamb - holidayed here regularly.
Ken W. MacDonald - owns a home in the village

See also
Isle of Bute

References

External links

 Photographs of the area

Ports and harbours of Scotland
Seaside resorts in Scotland
Villages on the Isle of Bute
Lime kilns in Scotland

https://www.kilchattanbaykayaking.co.uk/